Tokyo Bound is a studio album by American jazz pianist Mal Waldron recorded in Tokyo in 1970 and released on the Japanese RCA Victor label.

Track listing
All compositions by Mal Waldron
 "Japanese Island" — 10:34  
 "Rock One for Jimbosan" — 13:01  
 "Atomic Energy" — 8:50  
 "Mount Fuji" — 12:41
Recorded in Tokyo, Japan on February 7 & 12, 1970.

Personnel
 Mal Waldron — piano 
 Yasuo Arakawa — bass
 Takeshi Inomata — drums

References

RCA Victor albums
Mal Waldron albums
1970 albums